The Kuwait women's national under-18 basketball team is a national basketball team of Kuwait, administered by the Kuwait Basketball Association.
It represents the country in international under-18 (under age 18) women's basketball competitions.

See also
Kuwait women's national basketball team
Kuwait men's national under-18 basketball team

References

External links
 Archived records of Kuwait team participations

Basketball in Kuwait
Basketball teams in Kuwait
Women's national under-18 basketball teams
Basketball
Women's sport in Kuwait